Asunder, Sweet and Other Distress is the fifth studio album by Canadian post-rock band Godspeed You! Black Emperor, released on 31 March 2015 by Constellation Records. The album was recorded with Electrical Audio engineer Greg Norman in North Carolina and Montreal, and was the first to feature completely new material since the band's reformation in 2010.  It is also, with the exception of the vinyl version of F♯ A♯ ∞ (ignoring the locked groove), the group's shortest album to date, timing in at just forty minutes.

The album was announced on 24 February 2015; the group also shared an excerpt of "Peasantry or 'Light! Inside of Light!'" on SoundCloud. On 24 March 2015, Constellation streamed the album on their SoundCloud.

Critical reception
At Metacritic, which assigns a normalized rating out of 100 to reviews from music critics, the album has received an average score of 84, indicating "universal acclaim".

Pitchfork rated the album 7.6 out of a possible 10 and Mark Richardson described the album as a "different kind of transaction" and that while listening to the album "You have to let your guard down" as that Godspeed "transforms feelings into compelling records. They're still on track." Writing for Exclaim!, Nilan Perera called the record "a beautiful, concise blast that conveys this band's musical essence".

Track listing
The album's four tracks are based on "Behemoth", played live numerous times since 2012 and previously recorded onstage for the concert series We Have Signal.

Personnel
Godspeed You! Black Emperor
Thierry Amar – bass guitar, double bass
David Bryant – electric guitar, Portasound, organ, drones
Aidan Girt – drums
Timothy Herzog – drums and drones 
Efrim Menuck – electric guitar
Mike Moya – electric guitar
Mauro Pezzente – bass guitar
Sophie Trudeau – violin, drones
Karl Lemieux – 16mm film projections

Technical personnel
Greg Norman – recording, mixing
Harris Newman at Greymarket – mastering

Charts

References

External links
Press release

2015 albums
Constellation Records (Canada) albums
Godspeed You! Black Emperor albums
Instrumental rock albums